Tolsky is a surname. Notable people with the surname include:

Amy Tolsky (born 1961), American actress
Susan Tolsky (born 1943), American actress